Mākara is a locality located at the western edge of Wellington, New Zealand, close to the shore of the Tasman Sea. The suburb is named after the Mākara Stream (mā is Māori for white, kara is a kind of greywacke stone).

The Wellington City Council regards the nearby Mākara Beach as a separate suburb.

With winding road access from Karori or Ohariu, Mākara is a rural area with sparse development. It has attracted people who want rural living near Wellington.

History 
In the nineteenth century there was a small amount of gold-mining at Terawhiti Station but no large-scale workable deposits were ever found. Tunnels associated with mining activity still exist on the hillside.

In 1921 the Makara War Memorial was unveiled, built in memory of local residents who died in World War 1, and another name was added after World War II.

There are gun emplacements at Fort Opau which still remain. These were built as part of the coastal fortifications of New Zealand due to fears of invasion during the second world war. A small foreshore reserve of sand dunes was bulldozed during this time as it was felt these could be hiding places for an invading army. This destroyed ecosystem is slowly being restored by local community groups.

The Cook Strait Cable comes ashore from the South Island at Oteranga Bay in the suburb of Mākara. The HVDC line came into operation in April 1965 and was at the time the world's largest submarine cable.

A radio receiving station was set up in 1944 in the region, at Quartz Hill, to receive overseas shortwave broadcasts for re-transmission by the New Zealand Broadcasting Service, close to the NZ Post Office Makara Radio receiving station. Subsequently from 1997 to 2007 the site was leased to a local amateur radio club, who installed equipment and multiple antennae to contact operators all over the world.

In 1973 Makara Riding, formerly under the jurisdiction of a County Council, came under the administration of the Wellington City Council.

West Wind, a proposal for a $380-million wind farm by Meridian Energy was approved by Wellington City Council in 2005. Opponents claimed that the project was too close to a populated area. In 2007 construction began on West Wind along Terawhiti Ridge. A temporary wharf was constructed in Oteranga Bay to move turbine parts into the area without going through Wellington's Central Business District.

The 62 turbine farm was completed in 2009 and includes a recreation area. The turbines are 111 metres high and cover a 56 square-kilometre area including Quartz Hill and Terawhiti Station.

In 2019, the name of the locality was officially gazetted as Mākara.

Demographics
Mākara is part of the Mākara-Ohariu statistical area.

Facilities

Parks and reserves 

The potential of Makara as a possible recreational landscape for Wellington city was recognised from the early 1970s. There is a small boat access at the north end of Mākara Beach into the river. There is a two-hour walk from Mākara to Boom Rock if the Mākara Stream is crossed.

Churches and cemeteries 
Mākara Cemetery is Wellington's largest cemetery. It was founded after Karori Cemetery edged towards full capacity in 1940, the first burial occurred in 1965. It is currently about one third full.

The burial ground Ngā Iwi o Te Motu Urupā is open for Māori and their whānau in Mākara Cemetery.

St Patricks Church was built in Mākara in 1873 by the Catholic Diocese. It is now a non-denominational, community owned church and often serves as a function area alongside the Makara Hall next door.

Education

Makara Model School, a co-educational state primary school for Year 1 to 8 students, is located in Mākara.

The school is a community emergency hub.

See also 
 Project West Wind wind farm and Makara Guardians
 Terawhiti Station

References

External links 

 1:50,000 map
 

Suburbs of Wellington City